Ulwandle Oluncgwele is an album by the South African isicathamiya group Ladysmith Black Mambazo, released in 1985 . It was rereleased by Shanachie Records in 1985.

Critical reception
AllMusic wrote that "the style is such a stunning display of virtuosity in its own way that one can hardly help but to enjoy the album."

Track listing
 "Izithembiso Zenkosi"
 "Limnandi Izulu"
 "Ulwandle Oluncgwele"
 "Sishumayel' Ivangeli"
 "Siphum' Emnqamlezweni"
 "Nkosi Yami Ngabusiswa"
 "Ayanqikaza Amagwala"
 "Baba No Mama"
 "Khayelihle Khaya Lami"
 "Lifikile Ivangeli"
 "Woza Emthonjeni"
 "Vukani Sihambe Zingelosi"

References

1977 albums
Ladysmith Black Mambazo albums